St. Philips Moravian Church is the oldest surviving African American church building in North Carolina. The Moravian church was built in 1861 on the east side of South Church Street near Race Street in Winston-Salem, North Carolina. St Philips was enlarged in 1890 and remained in continuous use until 1952. In 2004 it was restored by Old Salem Museums & Gardens for use as an interpreted building; worship services are still held at the church on special occasions.

History

Members of a local black congregation, newly formed in 1822, built a log church south of the 1773 'Strangers Graveyard', which had been designated as an African American cemetery in 1816. Between 1827 and 1831, a Sunday school was taught by white Single Sisters, until a state law forbade teaching literacy to slaves.

Moravian leaders built a larger brick church to the east of the graveyard in 1861. On Sunday, May 21, 1865, Rev. Seth G. Clark, 10th Regiment, Ohio Cavalry read General Orders 32, announcing freedom from the St. Philips pulpit. In 1890, an extension consisting of a central hall with a classroom on each side of the lower level and a large room above (which opened onto the sanctuary and could be closed off and used as a classroom) was added to the front of the building.

The brick church was referred to as the Moravian "Negro congregation" until December 1913, when at a lovefeast service it was given the name St. Philips by Bishop Edward Rondthaler. The church building was added to the National Register of Historic Places in 1991. The 1823 log church was reconstructed on its original site in 1999; the entire complex forms part of the Old Salem historical district.

References

Further reading
God's Fields: Landscape, Religion, and Race in Moravian Wachovia. Leland Ferguson. University Press of Florida: Gainesville, FL, 2011.

External links

Official website
Old Salem website with details about the church
Information on this church from the Moravian Archives
Information about the congregation

African-American history in Winston-Salem, North Carolina
Churches in Winston-Salem, North Carolina
Moravian churches in North Carolina
Churches on the National Register of Historic Places in North Carolina
Churches completed in 1874
19th-century Moravian Church church buildings
National Register of Historic Places in Winston-Salem, North Carolina
1861 establishments in North Carolina